Charles O'Neill (1849 – 14 January 1918) was an Irish nationalist politician and Member of Parliament (MP) in the House of Commons of the United Kingdom of Great Britain and Ireland.

He was first stood for election as the Irish Parliamentary Party (IPP) candidate for the South Armagh constituency at the 1900 general election, but was defeated by the Healyite Nationalist MP John Campbell. After the death of the incumbent IPP MP William McKillop, O'Neill was elected at November 1909 South Armagh by-election.

He was re-elected at the January 1910 and December 1910 general elections. He died in office in January 1918, and the February 1918 South Armagh by-election was won by IPP candidate Patrick Donnelly.

External links

1849 births
1918 deaths
Irish Parliamentary Party MPs
Members of the Parliament of the United Kingdom for County Armagh constituencies (1801–1922)
UK MPs 1906–1910
UK MPs 1910
UK MPs 1910–1918
People from County Armagh